روستای امین اباد معروف به قلعه که در بخشی از شهر فامنین قرار دارد. در سرشماری سال 2006 میلادی جمعیت ان 261 نفر و 51 خانواده تخمین زده شده است قدمت این شهرستان نزدیک به 350 سال میرسد که در این روستا خانوار هایی از اقوام استاجالو-عباسی-نجفی-میرزایی و ... که میتوان گفت کل اقوام این روستا ترک زبان هستند

Aminabad village known as Qaleh which is located in a part of Famenin city. In the 2006 census, its population is estimated at 261 people and 51 families. The city is nearly 350 years old. They leave the language.....

References 

Populated places in Famenin County